Polska Żegluga Morska known as Polsteam or PŻM, is a cargo ship operator based in Szczecin, Poland. Polsteam is a state-owned enterprise with around 3,000 employees.

Company history 
Polsteam was founded in 1951, nationalizing the assets of two Polish pre-WWII marine freight companies (Gdynia America Line  and ), making it the oldest Polish cargo ship operator in existence.

Initially, Polsteam's fleet comprised 11 ships of joint carrying capacity of approx 27,000 DWT. Among those ships there were: four of the so-called. French ships, which were steamers built in 1926 in French shipyard of Chantiers Navals Français, in Blainville: SS Wieluń, SS Kraków, SS Toruń, SS Poznań, the oldest of the acquired ships was SS Narocz (2,520 DWT) built in 1915 in Great Britain, SS Narew (310 DWT) a small coaster built in 1944 in Germany and SS Elbląg (1,699 DWT) built in 1944. Four ships of B-30 series, constructed in 1949 in Gdańsk Shipyard: SS Sołdek (first ship in the post-WWII history of the Polish shipbuilding industry), SS Jedność Robotnicza, SS Pstrowski and SS Brygada Makowskiego (built in 1950).

In early years of Polsteam's existence, the ship owner's vessels navigated on short and midrange sea routes (i.e. the Baltic Sea, North Sea and Mediterranean Sea). During the course of the first five years, they carried coal, wood, and iron ore. 80-90% of shipping involved tramping services and although the ship operator had three lines since 1951 namely: Szczecin - Stockholm, Szczecin - London - Rouen and Szczecin - Hamburg - Rotterdam - Antwerp.

Fleet 
It operates a fleet of 75 vessels (total: 2,500,000 DWT), mostly dry bulk carriers. Polsteam's particular specialty is the transportation of liquid sulfur.

Polsteam also operates a passenger ferry service between Świnoujście and the Swedish ports of Ystad and Trelleborg via its subsidiary Unity Line.

The PZM line operates a bi-weekly service from the IJmuiden docks in Amsterdam to the North American port of Duluth, Minnesota.  Five 35,600-tonners were built in Japan by Mitsui over the years 1999-2000, and eight 30,000-tonners were built in China by Nanting Mingde over the years 2010-12.  The older "Ziemia" class vessels were withdrawn from the Great Lakes trade before 2013.  The dimensions are limited by the locks of the Saint Lawrence Seaway and the 40 ft draught of the Great Lakes Waterway.  The Great Lakes Fleet comprise:

Polsteam Ships

See also 

 Unity Line
 Polish Merchant Navy
PAZIM

References

External links 
 
 Polsteam website
 Website of Unity Line, Polsteam's ferry service
 Polish Maritime Portal

Companies based in Szczecin
Transport companies established in 1951
Shipping companies of Poland
Polish brands
1951 establishments in Poland